Ron M. Gant (born December, 1971) is an American insurance agent and politician from the state of Tennessee. A Republican, Gant has represented the 94th district of the Tennessee House of Representatives, based in Fayette and McNairy Counties, since 2017.

Career
Gant was first elected to the Tennessee House of Representatives in 2016, after 94th district incumbent Leigh Wilburn resigned and interim appointee Jamie Jenkins declined to seek re-election. Gant easily won a three-way primary to fill the seat, and faced no significant general election opposition in the heavily Republican district. He has since been elected as Assistant Majority Leader in the chamber.

In 2019, Gant proposed renaming the Cordell Hull State Office Building after former Governor of Tennessee Winfield Dunn. While the move was supported by some fellow Republicans who disagreed with Cordell Hull's politics, Gant faced opposition from legislative Democrats as well as from Dunn himself; the building was not ultimately renamed.

Personal life
Gant lives in Piperton

References

Living people
1966 births
Republican Party members of the Tennessee House of Representatives
21st-century American politicians
University of Tennessee at Martin alumni
People from Fayette County, Tennessee